General elections were held in the Federation of Bosnia and Herzegovina on 2 October 2022 as part of the Bosnian general elections. Voters elected the 98 members of the House of Representatives of the Federation of Bosnia and Herzegovina and the assemblies of the cantons of the Federation of Bosnia and Herzegovina.

Results

House of Representatives

Assemblies of the Cantons

Una-Sana

Posavina

Tuzla

Zenica-Doboj

Bosnian-Podrinje Goražde

Central Bosnia

Herzegovina-Neretva

West Herzegovina

Sarajevo

Canton 10

See also
2022 Bosnian general election
2022 Republika Srpska general election

References

Elections in Bosnia and Herzegovina
Bosnia
General election
Bosnia and Herzegovina, Federation general election